I Am a Soldier is a 2015 French-Belgian drama film directed by Laurent Larivière, starring Louise Bourgoin and Jean-Hugues Anglade. Set in Roubaix, France, the film follows Sandrine, an unemployed young woman who finds herself initiated into the illegal trade of dog trafficking. It was screened in the Un Certain Regard section at the 2015 Cannes Film Festival.

The original title of the film is taken from the lyrics of the Johnny Hallyday song "Quand revient la nuit".

Cast
 Louise Bourgoin as Sandrine
 Jean-Hugues Anglade as Henri
 Anne Benoît as Martine
 Laurent Capelluto as Pierre
 Nina Meurisse as Audrey
 Nathanaël Maïni as Tony
 Angelo Bison as Roberto
 Thomas Scimeca as Fabien
 Eva-Luuna Mathues as Lola

Accolades

References

External links
 

2015 films
2015 drama films
French drama films
2010s French-language films
Films about dogs
Belgian drama films
2015 directorial debut films
2010s French films